Leucosyrinx taludana is a species of sea snail, a marine gastropod mollusk in the family Pseudomelatomidae, the turrids and allies.

Description
The length of the shell attains 23 mm.

Distribution
This marine species occurs off Argentina and the Falkland Islands, Tierra del Fuego, Argentina, South Atlantic Ocean

References

 Castellanos, ZA de, N. Landoni, and J. R. Dadón. "1993." Catálogo descriptivo de la malacofauna marina magallánica. Comisión de Investigaciones Científicas, Buenos Aires 2 (1988).
 Linse, Katrin. "Mollusca of the Magellan region. A checklist of the species and their distribution." Scientia Marina 63.S1 (1999): 399-407.

External links
 Gastropods.com: Leucosyrinx taludana

taludana
Gastropods described in 1993